Before We Get Married is a 2019 Taiwanese television series created and produced by Gala Television and Jason's Entertainment. The story is adapted from an original novel of the same title, penned by the screenwriter Fang-Yun Tsai 蔡芳紜, or also known by her pen name Ayamei 阿亞梅, who is also the screenwriter of popular Taiwanese series Love @ Seventeen and Boysitter. Directed by Feng Kai, it stars Jasper Liu and Puff Kuo as the main cast, both are reunited for the second time after Taiwanese series Pleasantly Surprised. Filming began in September 2018.

Synopsis
Zhou Weiwei is in a serious relationship with her earnest and average boyfriend Li Haoyi who works in the same company as her. Haoyi adheres to a strict planning of their lives and Weiwei faithfully follows it. On the other hand, Chu Kehuan is a capable and talented stock trader earmarked to be CEO of the securities company he is working for. He is in an unhappy 10 year long relationship with Gao Ziyuan, a beautiful woman who spends lavishly and devotes her life to him.

An unexpected meeting between Zhou Weiwei and Chu Kehuan leads to Kehuan being enamoured with her thrifty principles and strong personality. Kehuan sets out to woo her but Weiwei is committed to Haoyi and is turned off at his unfaithfulness. Weiwei is furthermore horrified when she discovers that he is actually the boyfriend of her college classmate. Despite this, Weiwei begins to doubt her relationship with Haoyi and finds herself drawn to Kehuan. When Haoyi insists on buying a house for them, they accidentally stumble onto Kehuan and Ziyuan's home. Because of its high price and Kehuan's flirty antics, Weiwei insists on turning down the offer. Kehuan approaches her and makes her an indecent proposal for her to spend a night with him in exchange for a discount. Though she agrees, Kehuan stops it. Despite their encounter failing to come to fruition, Kehuan still offers to give them the discount.

During a housewarming party, Haoyi invites Ziyuan and Kehuan to thank them. There, Kehuan kisses Weiwei while Ziyuan and Haoyi are gone. Weiwei reciprocates but quickly pulls away. He offers her a choice of staying and waiting for their significant others or running away together. Before she can answer, Ziyuan and Haoyi return. Haoyi proposes to Weiwei, and Kehuan is devastated when Weiwei accepts his proposal. Realizing that he can not spend the rest of his life with Ziyuan, Kehuan breaks up with her.

Haoyi is later offered a higher paying job and resigns, leaving Weiwei upset that he would not discuss such an important decision with her. Their relationship is further strained when he leaves for Shanghai for half a year, postponing their wedding. Kehuan comforts her while she battles loneliness and feeling unloved by Haoyi. Though Weiwei is determined to distance herself from Kehuan, a work related trip brings them together and their bond grows stronger. She almost sleeps with Kehuan but stops after receiving a phone call from Haoyi. She admits her feelings for Kehuan but because she cares for Haoyi, she is unwilling to break off the engagement. To mend her and Haoyi's relationship, she flies to Shanghai and realizes that he has never truly understood her or her plans for the future. She breaks off the engagement and travels back to Taipei, where Kehuan attempts to start a relationship with her. Their attempts at being together is complicated by Ziyuan and Haoyi's unwillingness to let them go, and their new roles in Kehuan and Weiwei's work project.

In the end, Weiwei and Kehuan resigns from their position. Weiwei decides that she must discover herself before starting a relationship with Kehuan, who vows to wait for her. They are finally reunited at a friend's wedding where Weiwei offers to take Kehuan out on a date.

Cast

Main cast
Jasper Liu as Chu Ke Huan
Puff Kuo as Zhou Wei Wei
 as Li Hao Yi
 as Gao Zi Yuan

Supporting cast
 as Han Ke Fei
Chen Mu as Yan Bai Yang
Leo Lee as Liu Da Wei
 as Gao Zi Ting
 as Wang Mei Ling
Wu Guang Jun as James
Cai Yun Xi as Ai Mi
Zhao Fan Xuan as Fan Fan
Song Cheng Xi as Cheng Xi
 as Bu Lan

Guest actors
 as Jessica
 as Wu Shu Ming
 as Jia En
Esther Liu as Mai Ruo Yun	
 as Li Jin Hui
 as general manager's wife
 as Chairman Wang		
Ming Dao as himself

Soundtrack
"Giving In 退讓" by Tseng Yu-jia
"I Miss You More 我比從前想你了" by Bii
"I'm Still Missing You 我還想念你" by Bii
"All You Did 都是你害的" by Bii
"What About You 那你呢" by Rennie Wang
"I'd Like to Hear the Details 願聞其詳" by Fang Wu
"The End 句點" by Dino Lee
"Darling" by Mavis Fan
"Digital Love 數字戀愛" by Mavis Fan
"Have or Have Not 有沒有" by William Wei

Broadcast

Ratings
Competing programmes on rival channels airing at the same time slot were:
 FTV - 
 EBC Variety - 
 SET Metro - , 
 SET Taiwan - , 
 CTV - Moon Embracing the Sun, Empress Ki
 CTS -

Awards and nominations

References

External links
TTV Official Website
GTV Official Website
Ayamei's Official Website

2019 Taiwanese television series debuts
2019 Taiwanese television series endings
Taiwanese romance television series
Taiwanese drama television series
Taiwan Television original programming
Gala Television original programming